John Philip Thurley (born 12 December 1947) is a male British former swimmer. Thurley competed at the 1964 Summer Olympics and the 1968 Summer Olympics. At the ASA National British Championships he won the 110 yards butterfly title in 1966 and the 220 yards butterfly title in 1966.

References

1947 births
Living people
British male swimmers
Olympic swimmers of Great Britain
Swimmers at the 1964 Summer Olympics
Swimmers at the 1968 Summer Olympics
Sportspeople from London
Commonwealth Games medallists in swimming
Commonwealth Games bronze medallists for England
Swimmers at the 1966 British Empire and Commonwealth Games
Male butterfly swimmers
Medallists at the 1966 British Empire and Commonwealth Games